Droitwich Road railway station served the town of Droitwich Spa, Worcestershire, England, from 1840 to 1855 on the Birmingham and Gloucester Railway.

History 
The station was opened as Droitwich on 24 June 1840 by the Birmingham and Gloucester Railway. Its name was changed to Droitwich Road on 10 February 1852. It closed on 1 October 1855.

References 

Disused railway stations in Worcestershire
Railway stations in Great Britain opened in 1840
Railway stations in Great Britain closed in 1855
1840 establishments in England
1855 disestablishments in England